Hans H. Mattsson is a former leader in the Church of Jesus Christ of Latter-day Saints (LDS Church) in Europe.

LDS historian Greg Prince described Mattsson as "the highest-ranking church official who has gone public with deep concerns" about the LDS Church.

Biography
Mattsson was raised in the LDS Church. As a young man he served as a missionary, as is common in the LDS Church, and was assigned to the Central British Mission headquartered in Birmingham, England. There he learned English, despite some difficulty, and felt his religious convictions grow. After returning to Sweden he married Birgitta, a convert to the church, and they have five children.

Mattsson and his twin brother Leif were both called in senior positions as leaders in the LDS Church. First Hans, then Leif, served as stake presidents in Gothenburg, Sweden. In April 2000, Hans became the first Swede to serve as an area seventy. He held a secular job in technology marketing, but traveled widely in Europe at weekends, overseeing the church. He was released from the position of area seventy in April 2005 when he had heart surgery.

Members began asking Mattsson about criticisms that they had read on the Internet, including the many wives of church founder Joseph Smith, the authenticity of the Book of Abraham, and the exclusion of black people from the priesthood until 1978.
Mattsson was dissatisfied with the answers that he in turn received from the church's highest authorities in 2010, and in 2013 he publicized his own doubts on John Dehlin's Mormon Stories Podcast and in the New York Times, stating that "I don’t want to hurt the church … I just want the truth."

In 2013, Mattsson and his wife moved to Spain for health reasons.

Bibliography

 English edition of Sökte sanning, fann tvivel.

See also 

 The Church of Jesus Christ of Latter-day Saints in Sweden
 Criticism of the Church of Jesus Christ of Latter-day Saints

References

20th-century Mormon missionaries
Area seventies (LDS Church)
Critics of Mormonism
Living people
Mormon missionaries in England
Swedish emigrants to Spain
Swedish leaders of the Church of Jesus Christ of Latter-day Saints
Swedish Mormon missionaries
Year of birth missing (living people)